Pussay is a commune in the Essonne department in Île-de-France in northern France.

Inhabitants of Pussay are known as Pusseins.

See also
Communes of the Essonne department

References

External links

Mayors of Essonne Association 

Communes of Essonne